Phorocerostoma is a genus of flies in the family Tachinidae.

Species
Phorocerostoma setiventris (Malloch, 1929)

References

Endemic fauna of Australia
Diptera of Australasia
Exoristinae
Tachinidae genera
Taxa named by John Russell Malloch
Monotypic Brachycera genera